Liopteridae is a family of wood-boring  parasitoid wasps. They occur worldwide with concentrations in the African Tropics.
These insects have a petiolate abdomen. There are 10 genera and more than 140 species known.

Classification

 Subfamily Dallatorrellinae (Australasian, Oriental)
 Genus Mesocynips Cameron, 1903 (Oriental)
 Genus Dallatorrella Kieffer, 1911 (Australasian, Oriental)
 Subfamily Mayrellinae (Worldwide)
 Genus Kiefferiella Ashmead, 1903 (Nearctic)
 Genus Paramblynotus Cameron, 1908 (Worldwide)
 Subfamily Liopterinae (Neotropical)
 Genus Liopteron Perty, 1833
 Genus Peras Westwood, 1837
 Genus Pseudibalia Kieffer, 1911
 Subfamily Oberthuerellinae (Afrotropical)
 Genus Oberthuerella Saussure, 1890
 Genus Tessmannella Hedicke, 1912
 Genus Xenocynips Kieffer, 1910

References

Apocrita families